The 1st Guards Cavalry Division was a Guards heavy cavalry division of the Imperial Russian Army.

Organization
1857–1918:
1st Cavalry Brigade
Chevalier Guard Regiment
 Life Guard Horse Regiment, also called the Leib-Guard Horse Regiment or simply the Horse Guards
2nd Cavalry Brigade
His Majesty's Own Cuirassier Guards Regiment, 
Her Majesty's Own Cuirassier Guards Regiment
3rd Cavalry Brigade
His Majesty's Own Cossack Life-Guards Regiment
Ataman Cossack Life-Guards Regiment of H. I. H. the Tsesarevich
 Combined Cossack Life-Guards Regiment
 1st Life-Guards Horse Artillery Division
Each regiment comprised four squadrons (or, in Cossack regiments, four , or "hundreds"); the colonels of the Guard regiments usually were Major-Generals in rank.

Commanders 
 23.12.1910—30.03.1916 — Nikolai Kaznakov
 02.04.1916—22.01.1917 — Pavlo Skoropadskyi
 10.03.1917—15.04.1917 — Evgeny Arseniev
 15.05.1917—06.08.1917 — Aleksander Eristov
 19.08.1917—         ? — Afrikan P. Bogaewsky

References 

Russian Imperial Guard
Cavalry divisions of the Russian Empire
Military units and formations established in 1810
Military units and formations disestablished in 1918